St. Paul Secondary School is a separate, Roman Catholic, high school in Mississauga, Ontario, Canada. It was established in 1971 and is part of the Dufferin-Peel Catholic District School Board.

References

External links 
 

High schools in Mississauga
Catholic secondary schools in Ontario
Educational institutions established in 1971
1971 establishments in Ontario
International Baccalaureate schools in Ontario